Virtual human may refer to:

 Visible Human Project, an effort to create a detailed data set of cross-sectional photographs of the human body
 Virtual Physiological Human, a methodological and technological framework
 Virtual body, a state of being when inhabiting virtual reality or a virtual environment

See also 
 Virtual actor, a creation or re-creation of a human being in image and voice using computer-generated imagery and sound
 Virtual Woman, a software program
 Virtual agent (disambiguation)
 Avatar (computing), a graphical representation of a user or the user's alter ego or character